North Fork is a  long 2nd order tributary to Aarons Creek in Halifax County, Virginia.

Variant names
According to the Geographic Names Information System, it has also been known historically as:
 North Fork Aaron Creek
 North Fork Aarons Creek
 North Fork Haron Creek

Course 
North Fork rises in a pond at the North Carolina-Virginia state line at Virgilina, Virginia, and then flows generally northeast to join Aarons Creek about 1 mile southeast of Midway.

Watershed 
North Fork drains  of area, receives about 45.5 in/year of precipitation, has a wetness index of 412.33, and is about 52% forested.

See also 
 List of Virginia Rivers

References 

Rivers of Virginia
Rivers of Halifax County, Virginia
Tributaries of the Roanoke River